Xavier Navarro de Torres (born 1956) is a Spanish painter and sculptor.

He was born in Barcelona, Catalonia, Spain, in 1956.

Expositions 
1976 Art. Expres Gallery, Girona, Spain
1979 La Caixa de Sitges, Barcelona, Spain
1980 Catalán Institut Ibero-american, Coop, Barcelona, Spain
1981 C. Tau Installation "Dream of Desert", Almeria, Spain
1982 Keller Club, Biel, Switzerland
1985 Estar Gris Gallery, Almería, Spain
1986 Münchenstein, Performance, Basel, Switzerland
1987 Galería Argar, "Paintings and Sculptures", Almeria, Spain
1988 Sala la Rectoría (s. XVI), "Ten Years Anthology", Barcelona, Spain
1989 Udo Walz Saloons, Berlin, Germany
1990 Galerie d' Art Imagine, Montreal, Canada
1991 Jomfruburet Gallery, Oslo, Norway
1992 Can Mercader Park, Barcelona, Spain
1997 Campari Bar (Art '97), Basel, Switzerland

Expositions in collaboration 
1975 Galery Aixo. Pluc (with Ferrán Maese, sculptor), Barcelona, Spain
1979 Can Mercader School (with J. Minguet, poet/writer]), Barcelona, Spain
1983 Keller Club (with Ana María Godat, painter), Biel, Switzerland
1983 New Acropolis, Arabian Palace of Abrantes (s. XI) (with Ana M. Godat), Granada, Spain
1984 Alte Krone (with Ana M. Godat), Biel, Switzerland

Group exhibitions 
1983 S.P. Société d'Art Suisse, Biel, Switzerland
1984 Works from Nicaragua (S.P.S.A.S.), Biel, Switzerland
1986 Bienal of Basilea 17.85, Bâle, Switzerland
1989 Montserrat Gallery, New York City, United States
1990 Galerie d'Art Imagine, Montreal, Canadá
1990 Montserrat Gallery, New York City
1993 Works to UNICEF, Almeria, Spain

Permanent collections 
The Archaeological Museum "Luis Siret" of Almeria, Spain
La Caixa de Barcelona, Spain
Mister F. Pérez Rodríguez, Almeria
St. Ramon Castle Rodalquilar Sculptures, Almeria, Spain
Mister F. Perez Rguez., Almeria, Spain
Mister Jack Wait, Berlin/Miami
Cartier, California
Savit's Center (New York)
1994 Suristán Spaces, Madrid, Spain. Stone-Wood Permanent Installation.
1995 Artist in Residence N.Y., New York (USA).
1996 St-Jaume Church (Barcelona), Spain. Can Mercader Park. Triptic-Painting (Permanent Mural Installation).

Selected works 
Los Músicos, oil painting, 1995–1996, 160 × 170 cm
Iberia, oil, 1995–1996, 105 × 130 cm
Tapiz azul, oil, 1996, 105 × 130 cm
Vidriera, oil, 1996, 105 × 130 cm
Tapiz rojo, oil, 1996, 105 × 130 cm
Talla de madera, oil, 1995, 105 × 130 cm
Aliga, stone, 17 kg, 40 × 20 × 20 cm
Busto, stone, 8 kg, 70 × 25 × 25 cm
Indios, wood-iron, 30 kg, 100 × 25 × 25 cm
Virgen, stone, 100 kg, 100 × 40 × 25 cm
Sin título, oil, 1996, 105 × 135 cm
Azul, azules, oil, 1996, 160 × 170 cm
La Gente que viene del sol, oil, 1996, 160 × 170 cm
La Gente que viene del mar, 1995, oil, 1995–1996, 160 × 170 cm
Hermético de Otoño, oil, 1995–1996, 160 × 170 cm
La virgen de Piedra, oil, 1996, 105 × 130 cm
África, oil, 1992, 105 × 135 cm

References

External links 
Page in Facebook
Asociación de amigos del Parque Natural de Cabo de Gata – Níjar
Hombres que viven en Cabo de Gata-Níjar Interview
"Fiskelangs" Proyect (2007 Helgeland), Norway

Bibliography 
MARÍN FERNÁNDEZ, Bartolomé. "Charidemos o diálogos de la mar", p. 206. Monte de Piedad y Caja de Ahorros de Almería, Almeria, Spain, 15 August 1990 .
HOF, Peter. "Xavier de Torres 1997". Basel, Switzerland, May 1997.
 Torres, Xavier de. Pintura 1. Ed. Magda Disseny, S.L., D.L. GI-34-2011, .

1956 births
Living people
Modern painters
20th-century Spanish painters
20th-century Spanish male artists
Spanish male painters
21st-century Spanish painters
Spanish sculptors
Spanish male sculptors
People from Barcelona
20th-century sculptors
21st-century Spanish male artists